Colville is a surname of Hiberno-Norman origin, that means somebody originating from one of the places called Colleville in Normandy, France. Notable people with the surname include:

 Alex Colville (1920–2013), Canadian painter
 Alexander Colville, 7th Lord Colville of Culross (1717–1770), British admiral
 Andrew Colville, London governor of the Hudson's Bay Company
 Bob Colville (born 1963), professional footballer
 Charles Colville (1770–1843), British military leader during the Peninsular War
 Christina Marshall Colville (1852–1936), Scottish temperance leader
 Maj.-Gen. Sir Henry Edward Colville (1852–1907), British military leader in Africa
 Jock Colville civil servant and diarist
 John Colville (disambiguation), the name of various persons
 Mac Colville (1916–2003), professional ice hockey player
 Mikael Colville-Andersen (born 1968), writer/director
 Neil Colville (1914–1987), professional ice hockey player
 Norman Colville (1893–1974), British Army officer and art collector

Surnames of Scottish origin